Malloco Airport is an airport  west-northwest of Villarrica in the La Araucanía Region of Chile.

See also

Transport in Chile
List of airports in Chile

References

External links 
OpenStreetMap - Malloco Airport
OurAirports - Malloco
SkyVector - Malloco Airport
FallingRain - Malloco Airport

Airports in Chile
Airports in La Araucanía Region